Emporia is a center of media in east-central Kansas. The following is a list of media outlets based in the city.

Print

Newspapers
 The Emporia Gazette, daily
 Emporia State University Bulletin, weekly, Emporia State student newspaper
 La Voz, monthly, Spanish language

Radio
The following radio stations are licensed to Emporia:

AM

FM

Television
Emporia is in the Topeka, Kansas television market. KETM-LP, a defunct translator station of Fox affiliate KTMJ-CD in Topeka, was licensed to Emporia and broadcast on analog channel 17.

References

Emporia, Kansas
Mass media in Kansas